Trudovka is a rural locality (a village) in Kebyachevsky Selsoviet, Aurgazinsky District, Bashkortostan, Russia. The population was 22 as of 2010. There is 1 street.

Geography 
Trudovka is located 14 km southeast of Tolbazy (the district's administrative centre) by road. Utarkul is the nearest rural locality.

References 

Rural localities in Aurgazinsky District